Youth Intervention programs are community based services work with young people when they are first beginning to make poor decisions that can have lifelong negative repercussions.  The goal of Youth Intervention programs is to encourage and build a young person's connections to the community, 
including developing meaningful relationships with caring adults, as a way to support academic achievement, as well as prevent juvenile delinquency.

Youth Intervention providers work with young people to help them become engaged and contributing members of the community. Typically, Youth Intervention programs work with young people between 6 and 18 years of age, but may also work with young people between 18 and 24 years of age.

While often viewed as a way to prevent young people from becoming involved in the juvenile justice system or avoid committing a re-offense, Youth Intervention has a broader impact. It is a way to work with young people who are struggling in school and may choose to drop out or are making choices that can lead to teen pregnancy or illegal use of alcohol and other substances, and also works with youth who are homeless and may find themselves in unsafe situations forcing them to make harmful choices.

Poor decision making or engaging in negative behaviors that can lead to interaction with the juvenile justice system can often be a symptom of an underlying problem. Causation factors can include unaddressed mental and emotional health struggles, unhealthy family environments and relationships, as well as stress and adverse childhood experiences (ACES) related to poverty.

With the wide variety of challenges that can leading to poor decision making, Youth Intervention encompasses a broad array of program approaches. Youth Intervention includes: pre court diversion, restorative justice, mental and chemical health counseling, mentoring, out of school time programs, transitional housing for young people who are homeless, as well as programs that promote employability. The membership of the Youth Intervention Programs Association (YIPA) reflects the diverse approaches used in Youth Intervention.

With a focus on prevention, measuring the impact of Youth Intervention is challenging. It is difficult to document that a behavior did not occur as a result of the Youth Intervention Program. However, research specific to Youth Intervention programs in Minnesota shows these programs to be effective in reducing truancy and improving school performance. They also result in reduced court costs, a reduced need for social services by the youth and/or family and improved health outcomes. The estimated cost per youth for Youth Intervention is $1,000 to $5,000 per year depending on the type of service. The study also estimated that quality Youth Intervention programs result in $4.80 of benefits per dollar spent on the program.

Youth Intervention produces positive outcomes at a much lower price than incarceration in a juvenile correction facility. Studies show that 70% to 80% of youth who are incarcerated are likely to re-offend. Studies also that for youth committing less serious offenses, incarceration is associated with an increased likelihood of re-offending upon release. And these poor outcomes have a high price. According to the Justice Policy Institute, it costs $407.58 per youth per day to be confined to a juvenile corrections facility. This can amount to as much as $148,767 per youth per year.

Underpinning Youth Intervention is positive youth development, which centers on providing young people with positive experiences, positive relationships and positive environments. To implement these three factors within a program requires programs to adhere to best practices. This includes having adults who work with young people in these settings to be highly skilled and knowledgeable about youth development. What is clear is that to build resiliency, young people need a web of support that includes parents, teachers and adults in the community. Adults working in Youth Intervention programs are part of that needed web of support.

The most successful Youth Intervention programs prevent the delinquent or harmful behavior from occurring. But documenting how a program led to a youth not engaging in a behavior is difficult to measure.

Both the National Research Council and the Institute of Medicine state that prevention and early intervention is typically the most efficient, effective and the benefits are greater than the costs of prevention and early intervention programs.

Youth Intervention has come to be recognized as an important part of reforming the United States juvenile justice system.  It produces better outcomes and at a lower cost per youth than incarceration. Of youth confined in juvenile correction institutions, many are confined for nonviolent offenses. Of all juvenile commitments and detentions, 40% are for offenses that are not clear threats to the community's safety. These offenses include low level property offenses, as well as status offenses (activities that are considered a crime only due to the youth's age; examples ae truancy, possession of 
alcohol).

Despite the high costs, incarceration does not produce positive outcomes for youth. Community based Youth Intervention produce much better outcomes for juveniles at low risk to reoffend.

References

Crime in the United States
Youth in the United States